The 500 metres is a rarely run middle-distance running event in track and field competitions.

All-time top 25
i = indoor performance
OT = oversized track (exceeding 200m in circumference)
A = affected by altitude
h = hand timing

Men
Correct as of December 2022.

Notes
Below is a list of other times equal or superior to 1:00.71:
Mark English also ran 59.60 on a road (2015).
Colin Campbell ran a hand-timed 59.7 (at altitude) (1968).
Pavel Maslák also ran 1:00.36  (2014).
 Brycen Spratling also ran also ran 1:00.37 on an oversized indoor track (2013).

Times rejected
Roddie Haley ran 59.82  in Oklahoma City on 15 March 1986, but this time was rejected as a record due to an incorrectly measured track. Haley also ran a 59.90  in Oklahoma City on 14 March 1987, but this time was rejected as a record for the same reason.

Women
Correct as of February 2023.

Notes
Below is a list of other times equal or superior to 1:08.6:
Anyika Onuora also ran 1:06.94 on a road (2018), and 1:07.04 on a road (2016).
Lynsey Sharp also ran 1:07.48 on a road (2017), 1:07.73 on a road (2018), and 1:08.05 on a road (2014).
Olga Kotlyarova also ran 1:07.74  (2007).

References

Events in track and field
Middle-distance running